Bulkley Valley-Stikine was a provincial electoral district for the Legislative Assembly of British Columbia, Canada from 1991 to 2009. It was succeeded by the electoral district of Stikine.

Demographics

Geography

History

MLAs
Frank Arthur Calder, CCF/NDP (1949–1975); Social Credit (1975–1979)
Al Passarell, NDP (1979–1986)
Larry Guno, NDP (1986–1991)
Jackie Pement, NDP (1991–1996)
Bill Goodacre, NDP (1996–2001)
Dennis MacKay, Liberal (2001–2009)

Member of Legislative Assembly 

Its last Member of the Legislative Assembly (MLA) was Dennis MacKay, a former private investigator, provincial coroner, and member of the Royal Canadian Mounted Police. He was first elected in 2001. He represents the British Columbia Liberal Party.

Election results

External links 
BC Stats Profile - 2001 (pdf)
Results of 2001 election (pdf)
2001 Expenditures (pdf)
Results of 1996 election
1996 Expenditures (pdf)
Results of 1991 election
1991 Expenditures
Elections BC
Website of the Legislative Assembly of British Columbia

Former provincial electoral districts of British Columbia